Referred to as "The first true robotic arthropod," Roboquad is one of the 5 robots that WowWee announced at CES in January 2007. It is a 4-legged robot that somewhat resembles a spider and a dog. Also designed by Mark Tilden, the Roboquad, like other WowWee robots, has multiple personalities, awareness of its surroundings, some autonomous behaviour and can be controlled via a remote.

Features 
Five Scanning Sequences
Smart Scan: examines its surroundings and reacts to changes
Scan Left and Right: turns and faces any nearby object
Approach Nearest Object: moves towards the closest object it detects
Escape Walk: moves towards the largest open space it finds
Flinch Response: reacts to rapidly approaching objects
Five Usage Modes:
Direct Control: user controlled movement
Autonomous Mode: self-directed interaction with its environment
Guard Mode: similar to Guard Mode on other WowWee bots, Roboquad reacts to noises and movement with sound effects.
Sleep: falls asleep after 5 minutes and powers down after 24 hours.
Demo: features a dance routine
Edge Detection
Remote Control: for controlling movement, programming, and adjusting personalities
72 Preprogrammed functions
40 programmable moves
Demo Mode

Hardware 
4x leg motors
4x leg motor position sensors
2x head and neck motors (its head can swivel around completely)
2x lens-focused, face-mounted deep Infrared vision (13 ft range)
1x microphone
1x light sensor
1x Infrared remote control
 Requires 4 x C and 3 x AAA size batteries

Personalities 
Like other WowWee robots, the Roboquad has multiple 'personalities' which are dubbed 'States'. Those states are State of Awareness, State of Aggression and State of Activity, and they can each be set to low, medium or high. In the Awareness state, it spends more time scanning its surroundings. When its Aggression state is increased, its behaviour simulates anger and aggression and finally the higher the Activity state, the further and faster the Roboquad will wander.

With its light, sound and IR sensors, Roboquad is pre-programmed to simulate reactions to external stimuli and acts accordingly.

Movement and Autonomy 

The Roboquad's legs all swivel around and so it is able to walk forward, backwards and sideways at about the same rate and mobility. Its head is also able to swivel around completely, so it is able to scan its surroundings without turning its body. 

In addition to its adjustable personalities (States), Roboquad's 5 different scanning sequences (described above in Features) are modulated according to how the personalities are tuned. 

The documentation states that Roboquad's infrared sensors are sensitive enough to allow it to navigate doorways.
It is also a good friend for people above 5.

External links 

Toy brands
Robotic spiders
Entertainment robots
Robotic dogs
WowWee
2007 robots